Christopher Moisés Díaz Figueroa (born 14 March 1990) is a professional tennis player from Guatemala.

Díaz Figueroa has a career high ATP singles ranking of World No. 326, achieved on 31 October 2011. He also has a career high ATP doubles ranking of World No. 267, achieved on 1 October 2018.

He has reached 23 career singles finals, with a record of 5 wins and 17 losses, all occurring on the ITF Futures Tour. Additionally, he has reached 50 doubles finals, with a record of 27 wins and 23 losses which includes an 0–1 record in ATP Challenger Tour finals. 

Díaz Figueroa has represents his native Guatemala whilst participating in the Davis Cup. He has a record of 14 wins and 14 losses in singles matches and 4 wins, 8 losses in doubles matches to make his total Davis cup record equaling 18–22.

His coaches are Celestino Diaz & Ruben Puerta. He is currently serving a two year ban for match fixing which was implemented in 2018.

ATP Challenger and ITF Futures finals

Singles: 22 (5–17)

Doubles: 50 (27–23)

References

External links

Living people
1990 births
Guatemalan male tennis players
Sportspeople from Guatemala City
Tennis players at the 2015 Pan American Games
Tennis players at the 2011 Pan American Games
Pan American Games competitors for Guatemala
Central American and Caribbean Games silver medalists for Guatemala
Competitors at the 2014 Central American and Caribbean Games
Competitors at the 2018 Central American and Caribbean Games
Central American and Caribbean Games medalists in tennis
Match fixers
21st-century Guatemalan people
20th-century Guatemalan people